The 1998–1999 Scottish League Cup was the 53rd staging of the Scotland's second most prestigious football knockout competition. The competition was won by Rangers, who defeated St Johnstone 2–1 in the Final. The Final was played at Celtic Park because Hampden Park was being redeveloped, work which was completed in time for the 1999 Scottish Cup Final.

This was the last season in which the competition was completed in the autumn, which meant that there was no League Cup Final held in the calendar year of 1999. The next Final to be played was the 1999–2000 Final, which was played in March 2000.

First round

Second round

Third round

Quarter-finals

Semi-finals

Final

External links
Scottish League Cup 1998/1999

Scottish League Cup seasons
League Cup